is a Japanese artist.

Her work is included in the collection of the National Gallery of Canada, the Getty Museum and the Stedelijk Museum Amsterdam.

References

1959 births
Living people
20th-century Japanese women artists
20th-century Japanese artists